Habibur Rehman Mondal (born 1986) is an Indian football player. He has played for Mohun Bagan AC and Mohammedan SC (Kolkata), in the I-League as a defender.

Career
Habibur plays as both right back and center back for Mohun Bagan. Habibur has been capped several times for India.

Honours

India U20
 South Asian Games Silver medal: 2004

References

External links
 http://goal.com/en-india/people/india/21513/habibur-rehman-mondal

Indian footballers
1986 births
Living people
India international footballers
India youth international footballers
Footballers at the 2006 Asian Games
Footballers from West Bengal
Association football defenders
Asian Games competitors for India
East Bengal Club players
Mohun Bagan AC players
Mohammedan SC (Kolkata) players
Southern Samity players
South Asian Games silver medalists for India
South Asian Games medalists in football